The following is a list of the more notable members of the Royal Yacht Squadron. There are 447 members in total.

Henry Dutton (1910)
Cuthbert Heath, OBE, DL (1910)
Kenneth McAlpine, OBE, DL (1920)
Lord Wakeham, PC, DL (1932)
Sir Timothy Sainsbury (1932)
Peter Nicholson, CBE (1934)
Baron Clinton (1934)
The Rt. Hon. Sir Anthony Evans, RD (1934)
Lord Glentoran, CBE, DL (1935)
Aga Khan IV (1936)
Rear Adm. Paddy O'Riordan, CBE, DL (1936)
The King of Norway (1937)
Sir Robin Knox-Johnston, CBE, RD (1939)
King Constantine of Greece (1940)
Sir David Cooksey, GBE (1940)
Sir Anthony Greener (1940)
Algy Cluff (1940)
Sir John Collins (1941)
Martin Clarke, MBE, DL (1942)
Ewen Southby-Tailyour, OBE (1942)
Sir John Parker, GBE (1942)
Lord Grade of Yarmouth (1943)
Lord Iliffe, DL (1944)
Lord Phillimore (1944)
Sir Robert Owen (1944)
The Earl of Normanton (1945)
The Earl of Cork and Orrery (1945)
George Magan, Baron Magan of Castletown (1945)
Adrian Brunner, QC (1946)
Lord Bamford (1945)
Peter Ogden (1945)
Lord Brabazon of Tara, DL (1946)
Bruce Mauleverer, QC (1946)
The Earl of Cromer (1946)
Rear Adm. Richard Phillips, CB, FNI (1947)
Hon. Christopher Sharples (1947)
Sir Graham Wilkinson, Bt. (1947)
Hon. Mr Justice Holman (1947)
Sir David Roche, Bt. (1947)
Sir James Dyson (1947)
Admiral Baron West (1948)
Sir David Clementi (1949)
Lord Strathcarron (1949)
Anne, Princess Royal, the first female member of the club (1950)
Roy Clare, CBE (1950)
Earl St Aldwyn (1950)
Sir Julian Berney, Bt. (1952)
General Lord Richards (1952)
Rt. Hon. Lord Justice Briggs (1954)
Vice Admiral Sir Timothy Laurence (1955)
Lord Fairfax (1956)
Sam Laidlaw (1956)
The Prince of Monaco (1958)
Sir Charles Dunstone, CVO (1964)
Nick Rogers (1977)

References

 Debrett's People of Today, 2011

Yacht clubs in England
Royal Yacht Squadron